A Chinese radical or indexing component is a graphical component of a Chinese character under which the character is traditionally listed in a Chinese dictionary.  This component is often a semantic indicator similar to a morpheme, though sometimes it may be a phonetic component or even an artificially extracted portion of the character. In some cases the original semantic or phonological connection has become obscure, owing to changes in character meaning or pronunciation over time. 

The English term "radical" is based on an analogy between the structure of characters and inflection of words in European languages. Radicals are also sometimes called "classifiers", but this name is more commonly applied to grammatical classifiers (measure words).

History 

In the earliest Chinese dictionaries, such as the Erya (3rd century BC), characters were grouped together in broad semantic categories.
Because the vast majority of characters are phono-semantic compounds, combining a semantic component with a phonetic component, each semantic component tended to recur within a particular section of the dictionary. In the 2nd century AD, the Han dynasty scholar Xu Shen organized his etymological dictionary Shuowen Jiezi by selecting 540 recurring graphic elements he called bù (部 , "categories"). Most were common semantic components, but they also included shared graphic elements such as a dot or horizontal stroke. Some were even artificially extracted groups of strokes, termed "glyphs" by Serruys (1984, p. 657), which never had an independent existence other than being listed in Shuowen. Each character was listed under only one element, which is then referred to as the radical for that character. For example, characters containing 女 nǚ "female" or 木 mù "tree, wood" are often grouped together in the sections for those radicals.

Mei Yingzuo's 1615 dictionary Zihui made two further innovations. He reduced the list of radicals to 214, and arranged characters under each radical in increasing order of the number of additional strokes – the "radical-and-stroke-count" method still used in the vast majority of present-day Chinese dictionaries.  These innovations were also adopted by the more famous Kangxi Dictionary of 1716. Thus the standard 214 radicals introduced in the Zihui are usually known as the Kangxi radicals. These were first called bùshǒu (部首, literally "section header") in the Kangxi Dictionary. Although there is some variation in such lists – depending primarily on what secondary radicals are also indexed – these canonical 214 radicals of the Kangxi Dictionary still serve as the basis for most modern Chinese dictionaries. Some of the graphically similar radicals are combined in many dictionaries, such as 月 yuè "moon" and the 月 form (⺼) of 肉 ròu, "meat, flesh".

After the writing system reform in Mainland China, the traditional set of Kangxi Radicals became unsuitable for indexing Simplified Chinese characters. In 1983, the Committee for Reforming the Chinese Written Language and the State Administration of Publication of China published The Table of Unified Indexing Chinese Character Components (Draft). In 2009, the Ministry of Education of the People's Republic of China and the State Language Work Committee issued The Table of Indexing Chinese Character Components (GF 0011-2009 ), which includes 201 principal indexing components and 100 associated indexing components (In China's normative documents, "radical" is defined as any component or  piānpáng of Chinese characters, while  is translated as "indexing component".).

Shape and position within characters

Radicals may appear in any position in a character. For example, 女 appears on the left side in the characters 姐, 媽, 她, 好 and 姓, but it appears at the bottom in 妾.  However, there are two radicals that have the shape 阝, but are indexed as different radicals depending on where they appear. When used with the abbreviated radical form of 邑 yì "city" it gives 都 dū "metropolis", also read as dōu "all-city" it appears on the right, but when used with the abbreviated radical form of 阜 fù "mound, hill" (as in 陸 lù "land") it appears on the left. However, there are regularities in the positioning next to ("within") most characters, depending on function: semantic components tend to appear on the top or on the left side of the character; similarly, phonetic components tend to appear on the right side of the character or at its bottom. These are loose rules, though, and exceptions are plenty. Sometimes, the radical may span more than one side, as in 園  = 囗 "enclosure" + 袁, or 街 =  行 "go, movement" + 圭. More complicated combinations exist, such as 勝 = 力 "strength" + 朕—the radical is in the lower-right quadrant.

Many character components (including radicals) are distorted or changed to fit into a block with others.  They may be narrowed, shortened, or may have different shapes entirely. Changes in shape, rather than simple distortion, may result in fewer pen strokes. In some cases, combinations may have alternates. The shape of the component can depend on its placement with other elements in the character.

Some of the most important variant combining forms (besides 邑 → 阝 and 阜 → 阝per the above) are:
 刀 "knife"  → 刂 when placed to the right of other elements:
 examples: 分, 召 ~ 刖
 counter-example: 切
 人 "man" → 亻 on the left:
 囚, 仄, 坐 ~ 他
 counter-example: 从
 心 "heart" → 忄 on the left:
 杺, 您, 恭* ~ 快
(*) 心 occasionally becomes ⺗ when written at the foot of a character.
 手 "hand" → 扌 on the left:
 杽, 拏, 掱 ~ 扡
 counter-example: 拜
 水 "water" → 氵 on the left:
 汆, 呇, 沊 ~ 池
 counter-example: 沝
 火 "fire" → 灬 at the bottom:
 伙, 秋, 灱 ~ 黑
 counter-example: 災
 犬 "dog" → 犭 on the left:
 伏, 状 ~ 狙
 counter-example: 㹜

Semantic components

Over 80% of Chinese characters are phono-semantic compounds: a semantic component gives a broad category of meaning – the phonetic component suggests the sound. Usually, the radical is the semantic component.

Thus, although some authors use the term "radical" for semantic components (義符 yìfú), others distinguish the latter as "determinatives" or "significs" or by some other term.

Many radicals are merely artificial extractions of portions of characters, some of which further truncated or changed when applied (such as 亅 jué or juě  in 了 liǎo), as explained by Serruys (1984), who therefore prefers the term "glyph" extraction rather than graphic extraction. This is even truer of modern dictionaries, which cut radicals to less than half the number in Shuowen, at which point it becomes impossible to have enough to cover a semantic element of every character. A sample of the Far Eastern Chinese English Dictionary of mere artificial extraction of a stroke from sub-entries:
一 in 丁 dīng and 且 qiě
乙 yǐ in 九 jiǔ
亅 jué/juě  in 了 liǎo/le
二 èr in 亞 yà/yǎ
田 tián in 禺 yù
豕 shǐ in 象 xiàng.

Phonetic components
Radicals sometimes instead play a phonetic role:

In some cases, chosen radicals used phonetically coincidentally are in keeping, in step, semantically.

Character simplification

The character simplification adopted in the People's Republic of China and elsewhere has modified a number of components, including those used as radicals.  This has created a number of new radical forms. For instance, in traditional writing, the character 金 jīn is written  釒(that is, with the same number of strokes, and only a minor variation) as a radical, but in simplified characters is written 钅 as a radical. That means, simplified writing has created a significant difference not present in traditional writing. A character using this radical is yín "silver"; traditionally: 銀, simplified: 银.

Dictionary lookup
Many dictionaries support using radical classification to index and lookup characters, although many present-day dictionaries supplement it with other methods as well. For example, modern dictionaries in PRC usually use the Pinyin transcription of a character to perform character lookup. Following the "section-header-and-stroke-count" method of Mei Yingzuo, characters are listed by their radical and then ordered by the number of strokes needed to write them.

The steps involved in looking up a character are:
Identify the radical under which the character is most likely to have been indexed. If one does not know, then the component on the left side or top is often a good first guess.
Find the section of the dictionary associated with that radical.
Count the number of strokes in the remaining portion of the character.
Find the pages listing characters under that radical that have that number of additional strokes.
Find the appropriate entry or experiment with different choices for steps 1 and 3.

For example, consider the character 信 xìn, meaning "truth", "faith", "sincerity", and "trust".  Its radical is 亻 rén "human" (a compressed form of 人) and there are seven additional strokes in the remaining portion (言 yán, "speech").  To look up this character in a dictionary, one finds the radical for "human" in the part of dictionary that indexes radicals. The various radicals will be organized by the number of strokes they themselves contain. 人 and its compressed version 亻 contain only two strokes, so it will be near the beginning of the list. Locating it, one can see the page for the index on that radical, and one then normally passes through the lists of characters with one additional stroke, two additional strokes, etc. until one reaches the entries with seven additional strokes. If the chosen radical matches the radical used by the dictionary compiler (which can be difficult to guarantee for more complicated characters), and if both the user and the dictionary compiler count strokes the same way (also often a problem with characters that the user is unfamiliar with), the entry will be in that list, and will appear next to an entry number or a page number where the full dictionary entry for that character can be found.

As a rule of thumb, components at the left or top of the character, or elements which surround the rest of the character, are the ones most likely to be used as radical.  For example, 信 is typically indexed under the left-side component 人 instead of the right-side 言; and 套 is typically indexed under the top 大 instead of the bottom 長.  There are, however, idiosyncratic differences between dictionaries, and except for simple cases, the same character cannot be assumed to be indexed the same way in two different dictionaries.

In order to further ease dictionary lookup, dictionaries sometimes list radicals both under the number of strokes used to write their canonical form and under the number of strokes used to write their variant forms.  For example, 心 can be listed as a four-stroke radical but might also be listed as a three-stroke radical because it is usually written as 忄 when it forms a part of another character.  This means that the dictionary user need not know that the two are etymologically identical.

It is sometimes possible to find a single character indexed under multiple radicals.  For example, many dictionaries list 義 under either 羊 or 戈 (the radical of its lower part 我).  Furthermore, with digital dictionaries, it is now possible to search for characters by cross-reference. Using this "multi-component method" a relatively new development enabled by computing technology, the user can select all of a character's components from a table and the computer will present a list of matching characters. This eliminates the guesswork of choosing the correct radical and calculating the correct stroke count, and cuts down searching time significantly.  One can query for characters containing both 羊 and 戈, and get back only five characters (羢, 義, 儀, 羬 and  羲) to search through. The Academia Sinica's 漢字構形資料庫 Chinese character structure database also works this way, returning only seven characters in this instance.  Harbaugh's Chinese Characters dictionary similarly allows searches based on any component. Some modern computer dictionaries allow the user to draw characters with a mouse, stylus or finger, ideally tolerating a degree of imperfection, thus eliminating the problem of radical identification altogether.

Variations in the number of radicals
Though radicals are widely accepted as a method to categorize Chinese characters and to locate a certain character in a dictionary, there is no universal agreement about either the exact number of radicals, or the set of radicals. This is because radicals are merely arbitrarily chosen categories for lexicographical purposes.

The 214 Kangxi radicals act as a de facto standard, which may not be duplicated exactly in every Chinese dictionary, but which few dictionary compilers can afford to completely ignore.  They serve as the basis for many computer encoding systems. Specifically, the Unicode standard's radical-stroke charts are based on the Kangxi radicals or radicals.

The count of commonly used radicals in modern abridged dictionaries is often less than 214. The Oxford Concise English–Chinese Dictionary, for example, has 188.  A few dictionaries also introduce new radicals based on the principles first used by Xu Shen, treating groups of radicals that are used together in many different characters as a kind of radical.

In modern practice, radicals are primarily used as lexicographic tools and as learning aids when writing characters.  They have become increasingly disconnected from meaning, etymology and phonetics.

Limitations and flexibility
Some of the radicals used in Chinese dictionaries, even in the era of Kangxi, were not standalone current-usage characters; they indexed unique characters that lacked more obvious qualifiers.  The radical 鬯 (chàng "sacrificial wine") indexes only a few characters. Modern dictionaries tend to eliminate these when it is possible to find some more widely used graphic element under which a character can be categorized. Some do indexing under more than one radical and/or set of key elements to make it easier to find characters.

Unicode

See also 

Chinese character description languages
List of kanji radicals by stroke count
List of kanji radicals by frequency

Notes

References

Works cited
  (revised 2003)
 
  (English translation of Wénzìxué Gàiyào 文字學概要, Shangwu, 1988.)
 
  Translated from the French original ca. 1915 by L. Davrout, S.J., orig. Catholic Mission Press; reprinted in US – Dover; Taiwan – Lucky Book Co. Dover paperback .

Further reading 
 Luó Zhènyù (羅振玉) 1958. 增訂殷墟書契考釋 (revised and enlarged edition on the interpretation of oracle bone inscriptions). Taipei: Yiwen Publishing (cited in Wu 1990).
 Serruys, Paul L-M. (1984) "On the System of the Pu Shou 部首 in the Shuo-wen chieh-tzu 說文解字", in 中央研究院歷史語言研究所集刊  Zhōngyāng Yánjiūyuàn Lìshǐ Yǔyán Yánjiūsuǒ Jíkān, v. 55:4, pp. 651–754.
 Xu Shen Shuōwén Jǐezì (說文解字), is most often accessed in annotated versions, the most famous of which is Duan Yucai (1815). 說文解字注 Shuōwén Jǐezì Zhù (commentary on the Shuōwén Jíezì), compiled 1776–1807, and still reproduced in facsimile by various publishers. The reproduction by 天工書局 Tiāngōng Books (1998) in Taipei is useful because the seal characters are highlighted in red ink.

External links

 Chinese Character Radicals List of Chinese Character Radicals
 汉语大词典部首表 a list of radicals in the Hanyu Da Cidian

Chinese characters
Collation
Hanja
Kanji